Perus may refer to:

 Perus (district of São Paulo)
 Subprefecture of Perus, São Paulo
 Perus (butterfly), a genus of butterflies in the subfamily Carcharodini